The 2011–12 Handball-Bundesliga was the 27th season of the Handball-Bundesliga, Germany's premier women's handball league.

Team information

Regular season

Standings

Results

Champion play-off

Quarter finals

|}

Semifinals

|}

Finals

|}

External links 
 Kicker magazine 
 scoresway.com 
 Handball-bundesliga website 

2011-12
2011 in German sport
2012 in German sport
2011–12 domestic women's handball leagues